The Cantono Frigerio system was an Italian electric power supply for trackless trolleybuses with two wires about 20 inches (50 cm) apart being contacted by a four-wheeled collector on a single trolley pole. In English publications it was often described as Filovia system although the Italian term filovia means literally wire way, i.e. a trolleybus line or a trolleybus system.

History

Werner Siemens introduced the first collector for trackless vehicles with his Electromote cart in 1882, and in 1901 Max Schiemann demonstrated sliding contact shoes, which were pressed by springs against the overhead wires. Five years later Eugenio Cantono from Rome combined these two principles and exhibited six trolleybuses at the world's fair Milan International, 1906.

The power supply differed from those in other countries in that, as a collector, a four-wheeled truck ran underneath the wires, held in place by a trolley pole in the usual manner. The possible deviation on either side of the direct route was 10–12 feet (3.0 to 3.5 m). The cars were usually equipped with two 15-horsepower (11 kW) motors and had a carrying capacity of 20 to 24 passengers. Its design and construction have been so perfected that it would take easily very sharp curves, and would not leave the trolley wires even when running at a speed of 18 miles per hour (29 km/h). They could master larger grades than trams, it was claimed. The overhead wires had a diameter of ⅜ inches (9 mm) for 600 Volt direct current and could be used in both directions. The drivers stood upright in a cab similar to that of a tram.

Cantono was supported by the Fabbrica Rotabili Avantreni Motori (F.R.A.M.) in Genoa, which he had founded, and by the Società per la Trazione Elettrica in Milan, which produced Frigerio branded cars. This led to the term Cantono Frigerio system.

The system was very successful in Italy, where trackless trolley lines were very highly regarded in the first quarter of the 20th century. A total of more than 50 miles (80 km) of line were in use to the satisfaction of the municipalities by 1916. In some cities subsidies were paid for establishing such lines.

Systems

See also
List of trolleybus systems

References

External links

Trolleybus transport in Italy